Two statues of James Michael Curley (sometimes called James Michael Curley, Jr.) are installed at the intersection of Congress and North streets, in Boston, Massachusetts, United States. The bronze double portrait was created by Lloyd Lillie during 1979–1980, and dedicated on September 18, 1980. The standing figure measures approximately 77 x 30 x 80 in., and the seated statue measures approximately 55 x 38 x 43 in. The memorial was surveyed by the Smithsonian Institution's "Save Outdoor Sculpture!" program in 1993.

See also

 1980 in art

References

1980 establishments in Massachusetts
1980 sculptures
Bronze sculptures in Massachusetts
Government Center, Boston
Monuments and memorials in Boston
Outdoor sculptures in Boston
Sculptures of men in Massachusetts
Statues in Boston